Dennis A. Cowals (12 May 1945 - 22 October 2004) was a photojournalist who contributed many photos to the United States Environmental Protection Agency sponsored DOCUMERICA project. Hundreds of photos he took of Alaska during the construction of the Trans-Alaska Pipeline System have been published. He focused on both ground and aerial photos of geography, flora, and fauna. They are now in the public domain.

Cowals graduated from the Medill School of Journalism with a degree in journalism, and went on to attended the University of Alaska for his post-graduate studies in 1967. He worked as a photographer and news editor at the university starting in 1968. He became press secretary for congressman Don Young in 1971. In 1980, he launched a search for the Kad'yak, and later worked as an author and rescue guide.

Cowals died on 22 October 2004 of lung cancer. He was survived by his son, Dawson.

Publications

Gallery

References

American photographers
1945 births
2004 deaths
Place of birth missing